Talim Island is the largest lake island in Laguna de Bay, the largest lake in the Philippines.  The hilly island is within the boundaries of the Province of Rizal, under the jurisdiction of two municipalities. The western side is part of the municipality of Binangonan, while the eastern section is part of Cardona.

The island is volcanic in origin and forms the southwest rim of the Laguna Caldera.  Volcanism after the formation of the caldera created the maars and volcanic craters at the southern end of Talim Island, the largest of which is a  crater surrounding Brgys. Balibago and Tuna.

Political subdivision
The island consists of 24 barangays that lie along its shores, 17 belong to the town of Binangonan and 7 to Cardona.

History
Marking's Guerrillas operated on the island in 1943, during WWII.

Geography
Talim Island is located almost at the center of Laguna de Bay, a three-lobed lake the center of which is the Laguna Caldera. The southernmost tip of the island is called Talim Point.

The highest point of the island is Mount Tagapo, known locally as "Bundok ng Susong Dalaga" (Maiden's breast mountains) for the conical hill at its peak resembling the female breast. The hill is among the several in the Tagalog region that are called as such because of its shape.  This feature is best observed from neighboring Mount Sembrano in the Jalajala peninsula across the lake.

Economy
The island is rich in bamboo, which the islanders make into different types of furniture such as bamboo sofas, cabinets, tables, chairs and a lot more. It is their main source of living, while lake fishing is only secondary.

Also, along the lake are fish pens that supports the everyday needs of the islanders.

Religion
Three Roman Catholic parish churches are located on the island. The Santo Domingo Parish Church is in Janosa, Binangonan, Our Lady of Lourdes Parish Church in Navotas, Cardona, and San Francisco de Asis Parish Church in Habagatan, Binangonan. Also, a few Jehovah's Witnesses live on the island, and they have three meeting places called Kingdom Halls. The Iglesia ni Cristo has a place of worship in Barangay Subay, Cardona.

See also
 Laguna de Bay
 Laguna Lake Development Authority
 Breast shaped hills

References

External links

 Talim Island at OpenStreetMap
Philippine Standard Geographic Code
2000 Philippine Census Information

Islands of Rizal
Lake islands of Asia
Laguna de Bay